William F. Gibson (November 23, 1933 – May 2, 2002) was an African-American dentist who served as chair of the National Association for the Advancement of Colored People (NAACP) from 1985 to 1995.

Gibson was a graduate of North Carolina A&T State University and Meharry Medical College. He served as president of the NAACP's regional branch in Greenville, South Carolina before succeeding Margaret Bush Wilson as national chairperson. As chair, he encouraged voter registration and worked to increase economic opportunities for African Americans. In 1995 NAACP board members voted 30–29 to replace Gibson with Myrlie Evers-Williams, widow of Medgar Evers.

Gibson died of cancer at the age of 69 in Greenville on May 2, 2002.

References

External links
Juliette Fairley. "A martyr's wife steps forward: can Myrlie Evers-Williams restore the NAACP's credibility?". Black Enterprise, May 1995.
Phil W. Petrie. "William Gibson remembered by national leaders". The New Crisis. July/August 2002.

NAACP activists
1933 births
2002 deaths
American dentists
North Carolina A&T State University alumni
Meharry Medical College alumni
Deaths from cancer in South Carolina
African-American dentists
20th-century dentists
20th-century African-American people
21st-century African-American people